The Festival of Spanish Theatre of London (FesTeLõn) has taken place in June every year since 2013, when it opened at the Greenwood Theatre, with a production of El Diccionario (The Dictionary) by Manuel Calzada, a play about the lexicographer María Moliner, with Vicky Peña starring in the lead role. Its objective is to bring contemporary theatre beyond the borders of Spain, working with professional Spanish theatre companies. The plays are usually performed in Spanish with English surtitles in order to ensure that they are accessible to the widest possible audience. The festival also includes a full programme of related talks and workshops to complement the stage performances, as well as bilingual “meet the cast” sessions, with Q&A.

Production list 

 2013: El Diccionario (The Dictionary) by Manuel Calzada
 2014: En un lugar del Quijote (Somewhere in Don Quixote)  by Ron Lalá Teatro
 2015: Las heridas del viento (Wounded by the Wind) by Juan Carlos Rubio (starring Kiti Mánver)
 2015: La piedra oscura (The Dark Stone) by Alberto Conejero
 2016: Don Quixote by Bambalina Theatre Company
 2016: Arizona by Juan Carlos Rubio
 2016: Los espejos de Don Quijote (Reflections of Cervantes in Don Quixote)  by Alberto Herreros
 2017:	Rosaura by Paula Rodríguez & Sandra Arpa
 2017:	Big Boy by José Luis Montiel Chaves, Mario Ruz Martínez & David Roldán
 2017: Himmelweg – Camino del Cielo (Way to Heaven) by Juan Mayorga
 2017:	Encerrona (Lock-In), by Pepe Viyuela
 2018: Qué raros son los hombres! (Men Are So Strange!) by José Ovejero
 2018: Malvados de Oro (Golden Age Villains) by Jesús Laiz
 2018: A secreto agravio, secreta venganza (A Secret Vengeance for a Secret Affront) after Pedro Calderón de la Barca
 2018: Me siento pulga (Fleas) by Susana Hernández & Ascen López, after E. Jardiel Poncela & Miguel Mihura
 2018: La vida es sueño: el Bululú (Life's a Dream: Solo Performance) by Pedro Calderón de la Barca / Jesús Torres
 2018: Guyi Guyi by Juan Manuel Quiñonero & María Socorro García
 2019: Yerma by Federico García Lorca / Projecte Ingenu
 2019: Puños de harina (Powdered Fists) by Jesús Torres
 2019: La Calderona by Rafael Boeta
 2019: La Margarita del Tajo que dio nombre a Santarén by Ángela de Azevedo, adapted by María Gregorio & Anaïs Bleda
 2019: Grillos y Luciérnagas (Crickets & Fireflies) by Valeria Fabretti

References

External links 

Festivals in London
Annual events in London
Festivals established in 2013
2013 establishments in England